Phenomenology (from Greek φαινόμενον, phainómenon "that which appears" and λόγος, lógos "study") is the philosophical study of the structures of experience and consciousness. As a philosophical movement it was founded in the early years of the 20th century by Edmund Husserl and was later expanded upon by a circle of his followers at the universities of Göttingen and Munich in Germany. It then spread to France, the United States, and elsewhere, often in contexts far removed from Husserl's early work.
Phenomenology is not a unified movement; rather, the works of different authors share a 'family resemblance' but with many significant differences. Gabriella Farina states:A unique and final definition of phenomenology is dangerous and perhaps even paradoxical as it lacks a thematic focus. In fact, it is not a doctrine, nor a philosophical school, but rather a style of thought, a method, an open and ever-renewed experience having different results, and this may disorient anyone wishing to define the meaning of phenomenology.Phenomenology, in Husserl's conception, is primarily concerned with the systematic reflection on and study of the structures of consciousness and the phenomena that appear in acts of consciousness. Phenomenology can be clearly differentiated from the Cartesian method of analysis which sees the world as objects, sets of objects, and objects acting and reacting upon one another.

Husserl's conception of phenomenology has been criticized and developed not only by him but also by students and colleagues such as Edith Stein, Max Scheler, Roman Ingarden, and Dietrich von Hildebrand, by existentialists such as Nicolai Hartmann, Gabriel Marcel, Maurice Merleau-Ponty, and Jean-Paul Sartre, by hermeneutic philosophers such as Martin Heidegger, Hans-Georg Gadamer, and Paul Ricoeur, by later French philosophers such as Jean-Luc Marion, Michel Henry, Emmanuel Levinas, and Jacques Derrida, by sociologists such as Alfred Schütz and Eric Voegelin, by Christian philosophers, such as Dallas Willard, and by American activist and scholar Angela Davis.

Overview

In its most basic form, phenomenology attempts to create conditions for the objective study of topics usually regarded as subjective: consciousness and the content of conscious experiences such as  judgements, perceptions, and emotions. Although phenomenology seeks to be scientific, it does not attempt to study consciousness from the perspective of clinical psychology or neurology. Instead, it seeks through systematic reflection to determine the essential properties and structures of experience.

There are several assumptions behind phenomenology that help explain its foundations:
Phenomenologists reject the concept of objective research. They prefer grouping assumptions through a process called phenomenological epoché.
They believe that analyzing daily human behavior can provide one with a greater understanding of nature.
They assert that persons should be explored. This is because persons can be understood through the unique ways they reflect the society they live in.
Phenomenologists prefer to gather "capta", or conscious experience, rather than traditional data.
They consider phenomenology to be oriented toward discovery, and therefore they research using methods that are far less restrictive than in other sciences.

Husserl derived many important concepts central to phenomenology from the works and lectures of his teachers, the philosophers and psychologists Franz Brentano and Carl Stumpf. An important element of phenomenology that Husserl borrowed from Brentano is intentionality (often described as "aboutness"), the notion that consciousness is always consciousness of something. The object of consciousness is called the intentional object, and this object is constituted for consciousness in many different ways, through, for instance, perception, memory, retention and protention, signification, etc. Throughout these different intentionalities, though they have different structures and different ways of being "about" the object, an object is still constituted as the identical object; consciousness is directed at the same intentional object in direct perception as it is in the immediately-following retention of this object and the eventual remembering of it.

Though many of the phenomenological methods involve various reductions, phenomenology is, in essence, anti-reductionistic; the reductions are mere tools to better understand and describe the workings of consciousness, not to reduce any phenomenon to these descriptions. In other words, when a reference is made to a thing's essence or idea, or when the constitution of an identical coherent thing is specified by describing what one "really" sees as being only these sides and aspects, these surfaces, it does not mean that the thing is only and exclusively what is described here: the ultimate goal of these reductions is to understand how these different aspects are constituted into the actual thing as experienced by the person experiencing it. Phenomenology is a direct reaction to the psychologism and physicalism of Husserl's time.

Although previously employed by Georg Wilhelm Friedrich Hegel in his Phenomenology of Spirit, it was Husserl's adoption of this term (c. 1900) that propelled it into becoming the designation of a philosophical school. As a philosophical perspective, phenomenology is its method, though the specific meaning of the term varies according to how it is conceived by a given philosopher. As envisioned by Husserl, phenomenology is a method of philosophical inquiry that rejects the rationalist bias that has dominated Western thought since Plato in favor of a method of reflective attentiveness that discloses the individual's "lived experience." Loosely rooted in an epistemological device, with Sceptic roots, called epoché, Husserl's method entails the suspension of judgment while relying on the intuitive grasp of knowledge, free of presuppositions and intellectualizing. Sometimes depicted as the "science of experience," the phenomenological method is rooted in intentionality, i.e. Husserl's theory of consciousness (developed from Brentano). Intentionality represents an alternative to the representational theory of consciousness, which holds that reality cannot be grasped directly because it is available only through perceptions of reality that are representations of it in the mind. Husserl countered that consciousness is not "in" the mind; rather, consciousness is conscious of something other than itself (the intentional object), whether the object is a substance or a figment of imagination (i.e., the real processes associated with and underlying the figment). Hence the phenomenological method relies on the description of phenomena as they are given to consciousness, in their immediacy.

According to Maurice Natanson (1973, p. 63), "The radicality of the phenomenological method is both continuous and discontinuous with philosophy's general effort to subject experience to fundamental, critical scrutiny: to take nothing for granted and to show the warranty for what we claim to know." In practice, it entails an unusual combination of discipline and detachment to bracket theoretical explanations and second-hand information while determining one's "naïve" experience of the matter. (To "bracket" in this sense means to provisionally suspend or set aside some idea as a way to facilitate the inquiry by focusing only on its most significant components.) The phenomenological method serves to momentarily erase the world of speculation by returning the subject to his or her primordial experience of the matter, whether the object of inquiry is a feeling, an idea, or a perception. According to Husserl the suspension of belief in what we ordinarily take for granted or infer by conjecture diminishes the power of what we customarily embrace as objective reality. According to Rüdiger Safranski (1998, 72), "[Husserl's and his followers'] great ambition was to disregard anything that had until then been thought or said about consciousness or the world [while] on the lookout for a new way of letting the things [they investigated] approach them, without covering them up with what they already knew."

Martin Heidegger modified Husserl's conception of phenomenology because of what Heidegger perceived as Husserl's subjectivist tendencies. Whereas Husserl conceived humans as having been constituted by states of consciousness, Heidegger countered that consciousness is peripheral to the primacy of one's existence (i.e., the mode of being of Dasein), which cannot be reduced to one's consciousness of it. From this angle, one's state of mind is an "effect" rather than a determinant of existence, including those aspects of existence of which one is not conscious. By shifting the center of gravity from consciousness (psychology) to existence (ontology), Heidegger altered the subsequent direction of phenomenology. As one consequence of Heidegger's modification of Husserl's conception, phenomenology became increasingly relevant to psychoanalysis. Whereas Husserl gave priority to a depiction of consciousness that was fundamentally alien to the psychoanalytic conception of the unconscious, Heidegger offered a way to conceptualize experience that could accommodate those aspects of one's existence that lie on the periphery of sentient awareness.

Etymology
Phenomenology has at least three main meanings in philosophical history: one in the writings of G. W. F. Hegel, another in the writings of Edmund Husserl in 1920, and thirdly, succeeding Husserl's work, in the writings of his former research assistant Martin Heidegger in 1927.
For G. W. F. Hegel, phenomenology is a philosophical (philosophischen) and scientific (wissenschaftliche) study of phenomena (what presents itself to us in conscious experience) as a means to finally grasp the absolute, logical, ontological and metaphysical Spirit (Absolute Spirit) that is essential to phenomena. This has been called dialectical phenomenology (see Hegelian dialectic).
For Edmund Husserl, phenomenology is "the reflective study of the essence of consciousness as experienced from the first-person point of view." Phenomenology takes the intuitive experience of phenomena (whatever presents itself in phenomenological reflexion) as its starting point and tries to extract from it the essential features of experiences and the essence of what we experience. When generalized to the essential features of any possible experience, this has been called transcendental phenomenology (see Varieties). Husserl's view was based on aspects of the work of Franz Brentano and was developed further by philosophers such as Maurice Merleau-Ponty, Max Scheler, Edith Stein, Dietrich von Hildebrand and Emmanuel Levinas.

Although the term "phenomenology" was used occasionally in the history of philosophy before Husserl, modern use ties it more explicitly to his particular method. Following is a list of important thinkers, in rough chronological order, who used the term "phenomenology" in a variety of ways, with brief comments on their contributions:
 Friedrich Christoph Oetinger (1702–1782), German pietist, for the study of the "divine system of relations"
 Johann Heinrich Lambert (1728–1777), mathematician, physicist and philosopher, known for the theory of appearances underlying empirical knowledge.
 Immanuel Kant (1724–1804), in the Critique of Pure Reason, distinguished between objects as phenomena, which are objects as shaped and grasped by human sensibility and understanding, and objects as things-in-themselves or noumena, which do not appear to us in space and time and about which we can make no legitimate judgments.
 G. W. F. Hegel (1770–1831) challenged Kant's doctrine of the unknowable thing-in-itself, and declared that by knowing phenomena more fully we can gradually arrive at a consciousness of the absolute and spiritual truth of Divinity, most notably in his Phenomenology of Spirit, published in 1807.
 Carl Stumpf (1848–1936), student of Brentano and mentor to Husserl, used "phenomenology" to refer to an ontology of sensory contents.
 Edmund Husserl (1859–1938) established phenomenology at first as a kind of "descriptive psychology" and later as a transcendental and eidetic science of consciousness. He is considered to be the founder of contemporary phenomenology.
 Max Scheler (1874–1928) developed further the phenomenological method of Edmund Husserl and extended it to include also a reduction of the scientific method. He influenced the thinking of Pope John Paul II, Dietrich von Hildebrand, and Edith Stein.
 Martin Heidegger (1889–1976) criticized Husserl's theory of phenomenology and attempted to develop a theory of ontology that led him to his original theory of Dasein, the non-dualistic human being.
 Alfred Schütz (1899–1959) developed a phenomenology of the social world on the basis of everyday experience that has influenced major sociologists such as Harold Garfinkel, Peter Berger, and Thomas Luckmann.
 Francisco Varela (1946–2001), Chilean philosopher and biologist. Developed the basis for experimental phenomenology and neurophenomenology.

Later usage is mostly based on or (critically) related to Husserl's introduction and use of the term. This branch of philosophy differs from others in that it tends to be more "descriptive" than "prescriptive".

Varieties

The Encyclopedia of Phenomenology (Kluwer Academic Publishers, 1997) features separate articles on the following seven types of phenomenology:
 Transcendental constitutive phenomenology studies how objects are constituted in transcendental consciousness, setting aside questions of any relation to the natural world.
 Naturalistic constitutive phenomenology (see naturalism) studies how consciousness constitutes things in the world of nature, assuming with the natural attitude that consciousness is part of nature.
 Existential phenomenology studies concrete human existence, including our experience of free choice and/or action in concrete situations.
 Generative historicist phenomenology (see historicism) studies how meaning—as found in our experience—is generated in historical processes of collective experience over time.
 Genetic phenomenology studies the emergence/genesis of meanings of things within one's own stream of experience.
 Hermeneutical phenomenology (also hermeneutic phenomenology or post-phenomenology/postphenomenology elsewhere; see hermeneutics) studies interpretive structures of experience. This approach was introduced in Martin Heidegger's early work.
 Realistic phenomenology (also realist phenomenology elsewhere) studies the structure of consciousness and intentionality as "it occurs in a real world that is largely external to consciousness and not somehow brought into being by consciousness."

The contrast between "constitutive phenomenology" (also static phenomenology or descriptive phenomenology) and "genetic phenomenology" (also phenomenology of genesis) is due to Husserl.

Modern scholarship also recognizes the existence of the following varieties: late Heidegger's transcendental hermeneutic phenomenology (see transcendental philosophy and a priori), Maurice Merleau-Ponty's embodied phenomenology (see embodied cognition), Michel Henry's material phenomenology (also based on embodied cognition), Alva Noë's analytic phenomenology (see analytic philosophy), J. L. Austin's linguistic phenomenology (see ordinary language philosophy), and Paul Crowther's post-analytic phenomenology (see postanalytic philosophy).

Concepts

Intentionality

Intentionality refers to the notion that consciousness is always the consciousness of something. The word itself should not be confused with the "ordinary" use of the word intentional, but should rather be taken as playing on the etymological roots of the word. Originally, intention referred to a "stretching out" ("in tension," from Latin intendere), and in this context it refers to consciousness "stretching out" towards its object. However, one should be careful with this image: there is not some consciousness first that, subsequently, stretches out to its object; rather, consciousness occurs as the simultaneity of a conscious act and its object.

Intentionality is often summed up as "aboutness." Whether this something that consciousness is about is in direct perception or in fantasy is inconsequential to the concept of intentionality itself; whatever consciousness is directed at, that is what consciousness is conscious of. This means that the object of consciousness doesn't have to be a physical object apprehended in perception: it can just as well be a fantasy or a memory. Consequently, these "structures" of consciousness, i.e., perception, memory, fantasy, etc., are called intentionalities.

The term "intentionality" originated with the Scholastics in the medieval period and was resurrected by Brentano who in turn influenced Husserl's conception of phenomenology, who refined the term and made it the cornerstone of his theory of consciousness. The meaning of the term is complex and depends entirely on how it is conceived by a given philosopher. The term should not be confused with "intention" or the psychoanalytic conception of unconscious "motive" or "gain".

Intuition

Intuition in phenomenology refers to cases where the intentional object is directly present to the intentionality at play; if the intention is "filled" by the direct apprehension of the object, you have an intuited object. Having a cup of coffee in front of you, for instance, seeing it, feeling it, or even imagining it – these are all filled intentions, and the object is then intuited. The same goes for the apprehension of mathematical formulae or a number. If you do not have the object as referred to directly, the object is not intuited, but still intended, but then emptily. Examples of empty intentions can be signitive intentions – intentions that only imply or refer to their objects.

Evidence
In everyday language, we use the word evidence to signify a special sort of relation between a state of affairs and a proposition: State A is evidence for the proposition "A is true." In phenomenology, however, the concept of evidence is meant to signify the "subjective achievement of truth." This is not an attempt to reduce the objective sort of evidence to subjective "opinion," but rather an attempt to describe the structure of having something present in intuition with the addition of having it present as intelligible: "Evidence is the successful presentation of an intelligible object, the successful presentation of something whose truth becomes manifest in the evidencing itself."

Noesis and noema

Noesis and noema started in ancient/Classical Greek philosophy such as Socratic-Platonic dialogues and continued in neoclassical focus such as in German Idealism.  In Husserl's phenomenology, which is quite common, this pair of terms, derived from the Greek nous (mind) (all three transliterated) designate respectively the real content, noesis, and the ideal content, noema, of an intentional act (an act of consciousness). The noesis is the part of the act that gives it a particular sense or character (as in judging or perceiving something, loving or hating it, accepting or rejecting it, and so on). This is real in the sense that it is actually part of what takes place in the consciousness (or psyche) of the subject of the act. The noesis is always correlated with a noema; for Husserl, the full noema is a complex ideal structure comprising at least a noematic sense and a noematic core. The correct interpretation of what Husserl meant by the noema has long been controversial, but the noematic sense is generally understood as the ideal meaning of the act and the noematic core as the act's referent or object as it is meant in the act. One element of controversy is whether this noematic object is the same as the actual object of the act (assuming it exists) or is some kind of ideal object.

Empathy and intersubjectivity

In phenomenology, empathy refers to the experience of one's own body as another. While we often identify others with their physical bodies, this type of phenomenology requires that we focus on the subjectivity of the other, as well as our intersubjective engagement with them. In Husserl's original account, this was done by a sort of apperception built on the experiences of your own lived-body. The lived body is your own body as experienced by yourself, as yourself. Your own body manifests itself to you mainly as your possibilities of acting in the world. It is what lets you reach out and grab something, for instance, but it also, and more importantly, allows for the possibility of changing your point of view. This helps you differentiate one thing from another by the experience of moving around it, seeing new aspects of it (often referred to as making the absent present and the present absent), and still retaining the notion that this is the same thing that you saw other aspects of just a moment ago (it is identical). Your body is also experienced as a duality, both as object (you can touch your own hand) and as your own subjectivity (you experience being touched).

The experience of your own body as your own subjectivity is then applied to the experience of another's body, which, through apperception, is constituted as another subjectivity. You can thus recognise the Other's intentions, emotions, etc. This experience of empathy is important in the phenomenological account of intersubjectivity. In phenomenology, intersubjectivity constitutes objectivity (i.e., what you experience as objective is experienced as being intersubjectively available – available to all other subjects. This does not imply that objectivity is reduced to subjectivity nor does it imply a relativist position, cf. for instance intersubjective verifiability).

In the experience of intersubjectivity, one also experiences oneself as being a subject among other subjects, and one experiences oneself as existing objectively for these Others; one experiences oneself as the noema of Others' noeses, or as a subject in another's empathic experience. As such, one experiences oneself as objectively existing subjectivity. Intersubjectivity is also a part in the constitution of one's lifeworld, especially as "homeworld."

Lifeworld

The lifeworld (German: Lebenswelt) is the "world" each one of us lives in. One could call it the "background" or "horizon" of all experience, and it is that on which each object stands out as itself (as different) and with the meaning it can only hold for us. The lifeworld is both personal and intersubjective (it is then called a "homeworld"), and, as such, it does not enclose each one of us in a solus ipse.

Husserl's Logical Investigations (1900/1901)
In the first edition of the Logical Investigations, still under the influence of Brentano, Husserl describes his position as "descriptive psychology." Husserl analyzes the intentional structures of mental acts and how they are directed at both real and ideal objects. The first volume of the Logical Investigations, the Prolegomena to Pure Logic, begins with a devastating critique of psychologism, i.e., the attempt to subsume the a priori validity of the laws of logic under psychology. Husserl establishes a separate field for research in logic, philosophy, and phenomenology, independently from the empirical sciences.

"Pre-reflective self-consciousness" is Shaun Gallagher and Dan Zahavi's term for Husserl's (1900/1901) idea that self-consciousness always involves a self-appearance or self-manifestation prior to self-reflection, and his idea that the fact that "an appropriate train of sensations or images is experienced, and is in this sense conscious, does not and cannot mean that this is the object of an act of consciousness, in the sense that a perception, a presentation or a judgment is directed upon it" (see also Fichte's original insight).

Husserl's Ideas (1913)
In 1913, some years after the publication of the Logical Investigations, Husserl published Ideas: General Introduction to Pure Phenomenology, a work which introduced some key elaborations that led him to the distinction between the act of consciousness (noesis) and the phenomena at which it is directed (the noemata).
 "noetic" refers to the intentional act of consciousness (believing, willing, etc.)
 "noematic" refers to the object or content (noema), which appears in the noetic acts (the believed, wanted, hated, and loved, etc.).

What we observe is not the object as it is in itself, but how and inasmuch it is given in the intentional acts. Knowledge of essences would only be possible by "bracketing" all assumptions about the existence of an external world and the inessential (subjective) aspects of how the object is concretely given to us. This procedure Husserl called epoché.

Husserl concentrated more on the ideal, essential structures of consciousness. As he wanted to exclude any hypothesis on the existence of external objects, he introduced the method of phenomenological reduction to eliminate them. What was left over was the pure transcendental ego, as opposed to the concrete empirical ego. 

Transcendental phenomenology is the study of the essential structures that are left in pure consciousness: this amounts in practice to the study of the noemata and the relations among them.

Transcendental phenomenologists include Oskar Becker, Aron Gurwitsch, and Alfred Schütz.

The philosopher Theodor Adorno criticised Husserl's concept of phenomenological epistemology in his metacritique Against Epistemology, which is anti-foundationalist in its stance

Realism

After Husserl's publication of the Ideas in 1913, many phenomenologists took a critical stance towards his new theories. Especially the members of the Munich group distanced themselves from his new transcendental phenomenology and preferred the earlier realist phenomenology of the first edition of the Logical Investigations.

Realist phenomenologists include Edith Stein, Adolf Reinach, Alexander Pfänder, Max Scheler, Roman Ingarden, Nicolai Hartmann, and Dietrich von Hildebrand.

Existentialism

Existential phenomenology differs from transcendental phenomenology by its rejection of the transcendental ego. Merleau-Ponty objects to the ego's transcendence of the world, which for Husserl leaves the world spread out and completely transparent before the conscious. Heidegger thinks of a conscious being as always already in the world. Transcendence is maintained in existential phenomenology to the extent that the method of phenomenology must take a presuppositionless starting point – transcending claims about the world arising from, for example, natural or scientific attitudes or theories of the ontological nature of the world.

While Husserl thought of philosophy as a scientific discipline that had to be founded on a phenomenology understood as epistemology, Martin Heidegger held a radically different view. Heidegger himself states their differences this way:

According to Heidegger, philosophy was not at all a scientific discipline, but more fundamental than science itself. According to him science is only one way of knowing the world with no special access to truth. Furthermore, the scientific mindset itself is built on a much more "primordial" foundation of practical, everyday knowledge. Husserl was skeptical of this approach, which he regarded as quasi-mystical, and it contributed to the divergence in their thinking.

Instead of taking phenomenology as prima philosophia or a foundational discipline, Heidegger took it as a metaphysical ontology: "being is the proper and sole theme of philosophy... this means that philosophy is not a science of beings but of being." Yet to confuse phenomenology and ontology is an obvious error. Phenomena are not the foundation or Ground of Being. Neither are they appearances, for, as Heidegger argues in Being and Time, an appearance is "that which shows itself in something else," while a phenomenon is "that which shows itself in itself."

While for Husserl, in the epoché, being appeared only as a correlate of consciousness, for Heidegger being is the starting point. While for Husserl we would have to abstract from all concrete determinations of our empirical ego, to be able to turn to the field of pure consciousness, Heidegger claims that "the possibilities and destinies of philosophy are bound up with man's existence, and thus with temporality and with historicality."

However, ontological being and existential being are different categories, so Heidegger's conflation of these categories is, according to Husserl's view, the root of Heidegger's error. Husserl charged Heidegger with raising the question of ontology but failing to answer it, instead switching the topic to the Dasein, the only being for whom Being is an issue. That is neither ontology nor phenomenology, according to Husserl, but merely abstract anthropology. To clarify, perhaps, by abstract anthropology, as a non-existentialist searching for essences, Husserl rejected the existentialism implicit in Heidegger's distinction between beings qua existents as things in reality and their Being as it unfolds in Dasein's own reflections on its being-in-the-world, wherein being becomes present to us, that is, is unconcealed.

Existential phenomenologists include: Martin Heidegger (1889–1976), Hannah Arendt (1906–1975), Karl Jaspers (1883–1969), Emmanuel Levinas (1906–1995), Gabriel Marcel (1889–1973), Jean-Paul Sartre (1905–1980), Paul Ricoeur (1913–2005) and Maurice Merleau-Ponty (1908–1961).

Eastern thought
Some researchers in phenomenology (in particular in reference to Heidegger's legacy) see possibilities of establishing dialogues with traditions of thought outside of the so-called Western philosophy, particularly with respect to East-Asian thinking, and despite perceived differences between "Eastern" and "Western". Furthermore, it has been claimed that a number of elements within phenomenology (mainly Heidegger's thought) have some resonance with Eastern philosophical ideas, particularly with Zen Buddhism and Taoism. According to Tomonobu Imamichi, the concept of Dasein was inspired – although Heidegger remained silent on this – by Okakura Kakuzo's concept of das-in-der-Welt-sein (being in the world) expressed in The Book of Tea to describe Zhuangzi's philosophy, which Imamichi's teacher had offered to Heidegger in 1919, after having studied with him the year before.

There are also recent signs of the reception of phenomenology (and Heidegger's thought in particular) within scholarly circles focused on studying the impetus of metaphysics in the history of ideas in Islam and Early Islamic philosophy such as in the works of the Lebanese philosopher Nader El-Bizri; perhaps this is tangentially due to the indirect influence of the tradition of the French Orientalist and phenomenologist Henri Corbin, and later accentuated through El-Bizri's dialogues with the Polish phenomenologist Anna-Teresa Tymieniecka.

In addition, the work of Jim Ruddy in the field of comparative philosophy, combined the concept of "transcendental ego" in Husserl's phenomenology with the concept of the primacy of self-consciousness in the work of Sankaracharya. In the course of this work, Ruddy uncovered a wholly new eidetic phenomenological science, which he called "convergent phenomenology." This new phenomenology takes over where Husserl left off, and deals with the constitution of relation-like, rather than merely thing-like, or "intentional" objectivity.

Phenomenology as empirical science 
The phenomenological analysis of objects is notably different from traditional science. However, several frameworks do phenomenology with an empirical orientation or aim to unite it with the natural sciences or with cognitive science.

For a classical critical point of view, Daniel Dennett argues for the wholesale uselessness of phenomenology considering phenomena as qualia, which cannot be the object of scientific research or do not exist in the first place. Liliana Albertazzi counters such arguments by pointing out that empirical research on phenomena has been successfully carried out employing modern methodology. Human experience can be investigated by surveying, and with brain scanning techniques. For example, ample research on color perception suggests that people with normal color vision see colors similarly and not each in their own way. Thus, it is possible to universalize phenomena of subjective experience on an empirical scientific basis.

Notwithstanding, the scope of phenomenology is gravely restricted by bracketing. Phenomenology's aim is to study experience itself avoiding evolutionary or causal explanations. Husserl himself spoke strongly against the naturalization of phenomenology to fight the reduction of consciousness to psychology.

In the early twenty-first century, phenomenology became a trend in cognitive science and philosophy of mind. Some approaches to the naturalization of phenomenology reduce consciousness to the physical-neuronal level and are therefore not universally acknowledged as representing phenomenology. These include the frameworks of neuro-phenomenology, embodied constructivism, and the cognitive neuroscience of phenomenology. Other likewise controversial approaches aim to explain life-world experience on a sociological or anthropological basis despite phenomenology being mostly considered descriptive rather than explanatory.

Approaches to technology

James Moor has argued that computers show up policy vacuums that require new thinking and the establishment of new policies. Others have argued that the resources provided by classical ethical theory such as utilitarianism, consequentialism and deontological ethics is more than enough to deal with all the ethical issues emerging from our design and use of information technology.

For the phenomenologist the 'impact view' of technology as well as the constructivist view of the technology/society relationships is valid but not adequate (Heidegger 1977, Borgmann 1985, Winograd and Flores 1987, Ihde 1990, Dreyfus 1992, 2001). They argue that these accounts of technology, and the technology/society relationship, posit technology and society as if speaking about the one does not immediately and already draw upon the other for its ongoing sense or meaning. For the phenomenologist, society and technology co-constitute each other; they are each other's ongoing condition, or possibility for being what they are. For them technology is not just the artifact. Rather, the artifact already emerges from a prior 'technological' attitude towards the world (Heidegger 1977).

Heidegger's
For Heidegger the essence of technology is the way of being of modern humans—a way of conducting themselves towards the world—that sees the world as something to be ordered and shaped in line with projects, intentions and desires—a 'will to power' that manifests itself as a 'will to technology'.
Heidegger claims that there were other times in human history, a pre-modern time, where humans did not orient themselves towards the world in a technological way—simply as resources for our purposes.

However, according to Heidegger this 'pre-technological' age (or mood) is one where humans' relation with the world and artifacts, their way of being disposed, was poetic and aesthetic rather than technological (enframing). There are many who disagree with Heidegger's account of the modern technological attitude as the 'enframing' of the world. For example, Andrew Feenberg argues that Heidegger's account of modern technology is not borne out in contemporary everyday encounters with technology. Christian Fuchs has written on the anti-Semitism rooted in Heidegger's view of technology.

Dreyfus'
In critiquing the artificial intelligence (AI) programme, Hubert Dreyfus (1992) argues that the way skill development has become understood in the past has been wrong. He argues, this is the model that the early artificial intelligence community uncritically adopted. In opposition to this view, he argues, with Heidegger, that what we observe when we learn a new skill in everyday practice is in fact the opposite. We most often start with explicit rules or preformulated approaches and then move to a multiplicity of particular cases, as we become an expert. His argument draws directly on Heidegger's account in "Being and Time" of humans as beings that are always already situated in-the-world. As humans 'in-the-world', we are already experts at going about everyday life, at dealing with the subtleties of every particular situation; that is why everyday life seems so obvious. Thus, the intricate expertise of everyday activity is forgotten and taken for granted by AI as an assumed starting point.
What Dreyfus highlighted in his critique of AI was the fact that technology (AI algorithms) does not make sense by itself. It is the assumed, and forgotten, horizon of everyday practice that makes technological devices and solutions show up as meaningful. If we are to understand technology we need to 'return' to the horizon of meaning that made it show up as the artifacts we need, want and desire. We need to consider how these technologies reveal (or disclose) us.

See also

 Antipositivism
 British Society for Phenomenology
 Deconstruction
 Definitions of philosophy
 Ecophenomenology
 Empiricism
 Existentialism
 Geneva School
 Gestalt therapy
 Hermeneutics
 Heterophenomenology
 Ideasthesia
 Integrated information theory
 List of phenomenologists
 Neurophenomenology
 Noumenon
 Observation
 Phenomenography
 Phenomenological sociology
 Phenomenological Thomism
 Phenomenology (architecture)
 Phenomenology of religion
 Phenomenology (psychology)
 Philosophical anthropology
 Poststructuralism
 Psychodrama
 Qualia
 Social constructionism
 Society for Phenomenology and Existential Philosophy
 Structuralism
 Structuration theory
 Technoethics
 World Phenomenology Institute

References

Further reading 

 Algis Mickunas, From Zen to Phenomenology. (Hauppauge: Nova 2018)
 A Companion to Phenomenology and Existentialism. Edited by Hubert L. Dreyfus and Mark A. Wrathall. (Oxford: Blackwell, 2009)
Handbook of Phenomenological Aesthetics. Edited by Hans Rainer Sepp and Lester Embree. (Series: Contributions To Phenomenology, Vol. 59) Springer, Dordrecht / Heidelberg / London / New York 2010. 
The IAP LIBRARY offers very fine sources for Phenomenology.
The London Philosophy Study Guide offers many suggestions on what to read, depending on the student's familiarity with the subject: Phenomenology
 Dermot Moran, Introduction to Phenomenology (Oxford: Routledge, 2000) – Charting phenomenology from Brentano, through Husserl and Heidegger, to Gadamer, Arendt, Levinas, Sartre, Merleau-Ponty and Derrida.
 Robert Sokolowski, "Introduction to Phenomenology (Cambridge: Cambridge University Press 2000) – An excellent non-historical introduction to phenomenology.
 Herbert Spiegelberg, "The Phenomenological Movement: A Historical Introduction," 3rd ed. (The Hague: Martinus Nijhoff, 1983). The most comprehensive source on the development of the phenomenological movement.
 David Stewart and Algis Mickunas, "Exploring Phenomenology: A Guide to the Field and its Literature" (Athens: Ohio University Press 1990)
 Michael Hammond, Jane Howarth, and Russell Kent, "Understanding Phenomenology" (Oxford: Blackwell 1995)
 Christopher Macann, Four Phenomenological Philosophers: Husserl, Heidegger, Sartre, Merleau-Ponty (New York: Routledge: 1993)
 Jan Patočka, "Qu'est-ce que la phénoménologie?", In: Qu'est-ce que la phénoménologie?, ed. and trans. E. Abrams (Grenoble: J. Millon 1988), pp. 263–302. An answer to the question, What is phenomenology?, from a student of both Husserl and Heidegger and one of the most important phenomenologists of the latter half of the twentieth century.
 William A. Luijpen and Henry J. Koren, "A First Introduction to Existential Phenomenology" (Pittsburgh: Duquesne University Press 1969)
 Richard M. Zaner, "The Way of Phenomenology" (Indianapolis: Pegasus 1970)
 Hans Köchler, Die Subjekt-Objekt-Dialektik in der transzendentalen Phänomenologie. Das Seinsproblem zwischen Idealismus und Realismus. (Meisenheim a. G.: Anton Hain, 1974) (German)
 Hans Köchler, Phenomenological Realism: Selected Essays (Frankfurt a. M./Bern: Peter Lang, 1986)
 Mark Jarzombek, The Psychologizing of Modernity (Cambridge University Press, 2000).
Seidner, Stanley S. (1989). "Köhler's Dilemma", In Issues of Language Assessment. vol 3. Ed., Stanley S.Seidner. Springfield, Il.: State Board of Education. pp. 5–6.
 Pierre Thévenaz, "What is Phenomenology?" (Chicago: Quadrangle Books 1962)
 ed. James M. Edie, "An Invitation to Phenomenology" (Chicago: Quadrangle Books 1965) – A collection of seminal phenomenological essays.
 ed. R. O. Elveton, "The Phenomenology of Husserl: Selected Critical Readings" (Seattle: Noesis Press 2000) – Key essays about Husserl's phenomenology.
 ed. Laura Doyle, Bodies of Resistance: New Phenomenologies of Politics, Agency, and Culture. Evanston, Illinois: Northwestern University Press, 2001.
 eds. Richard Zaner and Don Ihde, "Phenomenology and Existentialism" (New York: Putnam 1973) – Contains many key essays in existential phenomenology.
 Robert Magliola, Phenomenology and Literature (Purdue University Press, 1977; 1978) systematically describes, in Part One, the influence of Husserl, Heidegger, and the French Existentialists on the Geneva School and other forms of what becomes known as "phenomenological literary criticism"; and in Part Two describes phenomenological literary theory in Roman Ingarden and Mikel Dufrenne.
 Albert Borgmann and his work in philosophy of technology.
 eds. Natalie Depraz, Francisco Varela, Pierre Vermersch, On Becoming Aware: A Pragmatics of Experiencing (Amsterdam: John Benjamins 2003) – searches for the sources and the means for a disciplined practical approach to exploring human experience.
 Don Ihde, "Experimental Phenomenology: An Introduction" (Albany, NY: SUNY Press)
 Sara Ahmed, "Queer Phenomenology: Orientations, Objects, Others" (Durham: Duke University Press 2006)
 Michael Jackson, Existential Anthropology

 Shaun Gallagher and Dan Zahavi, The Phenomenological Mind. London: Routledge, 2007.
 Jean-François Lyotard, Phenomenology, SUNY Press, 1991.
 Steinbock, A. J. (1995). Home and Beyond, Generative Phenomenology After Husserl. Northwestern University Studies in Phenomenology and Existential Philosophy. (Online)
 Suzi Adams, "Towards a Post-Phenomenology of Life: Castoriadis' Naturphilosophie", Cosmos and History: The Journal of Natural and Social Philosophy, Vol 4, No 1–2 (2008). (Online)
 Espen Dahl, Phenomenology and the Holy: Religious experience after Husserl (London, SCM Press, 2010).
 Arkadiusz Chrudzimski and Wolfgang Huemer (eds.), Phenomenology and Analysis: Essays on Central European Philosophy, Ontos Verlag, 2004.
 D. W. Smith and A. L. Thomasson (eds.), Phenomenology and the Philosophy of Mind, New York: Oxford University Press, 2005.

Journals
 Bulletin d'analyse phénoménologique
 Janus Head: Journal of Interdisciplinary Studies in Literature, Continental Philosophy, Phenomenological Psychology, and the Arts
 Journal of the British Society for Phenomenology
 Research in Phenomenology
 Newsletter of Phenomenology (online-newsletter)
 Studia Phaenomenologica 
 Indo-Pacific Journal of Phenomenology
 The Roman Ingarden Philosophical Research Centre
 Phenomenology and the Cognitive Sciences
 Continental Philosophy Review
 Human Studies
 Husserl Studies
 Phenomenology & Practice
 Journal Phaenomenologie
 Phainomena

Book series
 Edmund Husserl: Gesammelte Werke
 Edmund Husserl: Collected Works
 Edmund Husserl: Dokumente
 Edmund Husserl: Materialien
 Analecta Husserliana
 Phaenomenologica
 Contributions to Phenomenology
 Studies in German Idealism

External links

 What is Phenomenology?
 About Edmund Husserl
 Phenomenology – Internet Encyclopedia of Philosophy
 Cognitive Phenomenology – Internet Encyclopedia of Philosophy
 Phenomenology – Stanford Encyclopedia of Philosophy
 Organization of Phenomenology Organizations
 Romanian Society for Phenomenology
 Phenomenology Online
 Dialectical Phenomenology
 The New Phenomenology
 Springer's academic Phenomenology program
 Phenomenology and First Philosophy
 Meta: Research in Hermeneutics, Phenomenology, and Practical Philosophy
 Studia Phaenomenologica
 Phenomenology Research Center
 Open Commons of Phenomenology

 
20th-century philosophy
21st-century philosophy
Concepts in social philosophy
Concepts in the philosophy of mind
Consciousness
Consciousness studies
Continental philosophy
Criticism of rationalism
Edmund Husserl
History of philosophy
Intellectual history
Philosophical methodology
Philosophical schools and traditions
Philosophy of mind
Qualia
Social philosophy
Theory of mind